Curemonte (Limousin: Curamonta) is a commune in the Corrèze department in central France. It is a medieval village characterised by its three castles. In a fortified position on a ridge overlooking a valley on both its eastern and western flanks, the village has historically had a strategic importance in the area. Its inhabitants are called Curemontois.

Geography

Location
The municipality of Curemonte is located at the southern end of the department of Corrèze.

Physical geography
The village of Curemonte is built on a ridge line that overlooks the valleys of the Sourdoire and the Maumont.

Population

History
The existence of Curemonte is confirmed from 860.

It was in the 11th century that the village flourished, passing through the Viscounts of Turenne.

Places and monuments
 It is ranked among the most beautiful villages in France.
 It has three castles:
 Châteaux de Saint-Hilaire et des Plas;
 Château de la Johannie.
 It has three churches:
 Church of Saint-Barthélemy du Bourg;
 Church of Saint-Hilaire de la Combe: 11th Century Romanesque church, one of the oldest in the department, which was probably built on Merovingian foundations;
 The church of Saint-Genest: former parish church, now a Museum of Religious Art.

See also
Communes of the Corrèze department

References

Communes of Corrèze
Plus Beaux Villages de France
Corrèze communes articles needing translation from French Wikipedia